The Antalya Museum or Antalya Archeological Museum is one of Turkey's largest museums, located in Konyaaltı, Antalya. It includes 13 exhibition halls and an open air gallery. In addition a further 25,000–30,000 artifacts which cannot be displayed are in storage. As a museum exhibiting examples of works, which illuminate the history of the Mediterranean and Pamphylia regions in Anatolia, Antalya Museum is one of the most important of Turkey's museums. The Museum won the “European Council Special Prize” in 1988.

History of the Museum 
At the end of the World War I, during the time when Antalya was under Italian military occupation, Italian archeologists started removing archeological treasures that had been found in the city center and surrounding the Italian Embassy, which they claimed to do in the name of civilization. To prevent these initiatives, Süleyman Fikri Bey, the Sultan's advisor, applied to the Antalya post of provincial governor in 1919, had himself appointed as voluntary curator of antiquities, and first established Antalya Museum to try and collect what remained in the center.

The museum at first operated in the Alâeddin Mosque in 1922, then in Yivli Minare Mosque beginning from 1937, and then moved to its present building in 1972. It was closed to visitors for a wide range of modifications and restorations in 1982. It was reorganized according to modern museum concepts and opened to the public in April 1985, after the restorations and display arrangements made by the General Directorate of Ancient Objects and Museums.

Halls 
Antalya Regional Museum consists of 13 exhibition rooms, 1 open-air exhibition area, laboratories, a storeroom, repair shops, a photographic room, a conference hall, administrative offices, a cafeteria and living quarters for museum officials. The exhibition rooms are as follows:

Natural History Hall 
Shows living creatures from man down to one celled animals, charts and pictures, fossils and bones.

Pre-History Hall 
Here are exhibited works found in Karain, Okuzini and Sehahoyuk. Karain is a cave, which has been the scene of a continuous series of civilizations. The works range from those of the Paleolithic to those of the Roman Age. Works include animal fossils and kitchen utensils.

Proto-History Hall 
Here are exhibited works from the Neolithic, Calcolithic, and Early Bronze Age found in Hacilar. Excavations at Semahoyuk and its surroundings found most of the works.

Classic Period Hall 
Here there are works dating from the Mycenaean Age to the Hellenistic Age, including earthenware figurines, wine bowls, and dishes. In one of the Hellenistic showcases is an important statuette of Apollo. Besides these are statuary works from the Roman period, which make up the largest section of the museum. The list of containers includes Lekythos, Alabastron, Oinokhoe, Kothon, Aryballos and Lagynos.

Statuary Hall 
In this room are exhibited statues of mythological figures dating from the 2nd and 3rd centuries AD, Roman period. They were found in excavations at Perge. The list of statues includes the following mythological figures: Minerva, Zeus, Artemis, Harpocrates, Aphrodite, Asclepius, Tyche, Meleager, Hecate, Hermes and Marsyas.

Hall of Imperial Statues 
Here are exhibited statues portraying emperors, empresses and other personages from the Roman period. They were found in excavations at Perge. In the center of the room is a large statue of Plancia Magna, a great administrator who contributed much towards the development of Perge during that city's golden period. There are also statues of the Emperor Hadrian, the Emperor Septimius Severus and his wife Julia Domna, the co-emperor of Rome Lucius Verus, the emperor  Trajan, the emperor Caracalla and the king Alexander the Great.

Sarcophagus Hall 
Sarcophagi from the Roman period from Pamphilia and Sidemara are displayed here. The most beautiful of these are the Domitias sarcophagus, and the one showing the twelve labors of Hercules. The list of sarcophagi includes the Heracles Sarcophagus, the Sarcophagus of Domitias Julianus and Domita Philiska, the Sarcophagus of Aurelia Botiane and Demetria and the Dionysus Sarcophagus of the Attic Type.

The Mosaic Hall 
Here are exhibited Byzantine period mosaics found in excavations at Ksantos, and icons, from the region around Antalya.

Hall of church artifacts 
Wooden church illuminations depicting the life of Jesus Christ are on display lately. In addition, artifacts depicting Saint Nicholas and his sacred relics are on display preserved in its box.

Hall of Small Objects 
Here are exhibited lamps and glass objects dating from the Roman and Byzantine periods, a gold inlay silver tray found by treasure hunters at Kumluca, incense holders and lamps (6th century AD). To the front of the room are lintel figures from a tomb found opposite Lymira.

Hall of Coins 
Examples of gold, electron, silver, and copper coins from the Hellenistic to Ottoman periods are displayed in here. The most interesting of these are the city and imperial coins.

Turkish - Islamic Period Works 
This room contains examples of Seljuk and Ottoman tiles, Anatolian carpets from the Ottoman period, inscriptions, books, candlesticks, lamps, dervish paraphernalia, etc.

Ethnographic Hall 
Here are exhibited clothes, embroidery, weapons, and metal objects from the region of Antalya. One corner of the room has been furnished as a typical Anatolian house.

Children's section 
A hall in the entrance of the museum was organized as a Children's Museum, which is the first of its kind in Turkey. 
In the display windows of this section, there are various children's toys and antique moneyboxes. 
Simple restorations, and educational activity opportunities for ceramic sculpture and drawing are provided and their works are presented in the studio section, in order to make the children enjoy museums, antique objects and to awaken their interest.

Gallery

See also 
Antalya
Istanbul Archaeology Museum
Museum of Anatolian Civilizations

References

External links 

High Resolution Museum Pictures
 
Photos of some of the artifacts in the museum
Museum Galleries
Huge collection of pictures from Antalya's Archaeological Museum
A panoramic image taken in the Antalya Archaeological Museum

Museums in Antalya
National museums in Turkey
Archaeological museums in Turkey
Museums established in 1922
Buildings and structures completed in 1972
1922 establishments in the Ottoman Empire
Muratpaşa District